This is a partial list of people affiliated with The University of Alabama at Birmingham.

Administrators

Presidents 
 Joseph F. Volker, 1969–1976
 George Campbell, 1976-1977 (Interim)
 S. Richardson Hill, 1977-1986
 Charles "Scotty" McCallum, 1986-1987 (Interim) 1987-1993
 Claude Bennett, 1993-1996
 Paul Hardin, 1997 (Interim)
 W. Ann Reynolds, 1997–2002
 Malcolm Portera, 2002 (Interim)
 Carol Z. Garrison, 2002–2012
 Ray Watts, 2013–present

Alumni

Athletics

Business and public figures

Science, media and the arts

Faculty and researchers 

 David B. Allison, Distinguished Professor, Quetelet Endowed Professor of Public Health, Associate Dean for Science  
 Eli Capilouto, former Dean of UAB School of Public Health, former Provost of UAB, and current President of the University of Kentucky
April Carson, epidemiologist
 Larry DeLucas, astronaut and research scientist
 Ibrahim Fawal, professor of film and literature
 Edith Frohock, book maker and educator
 Stephen Glosecki, scholar of Old English
 Wendy Gunther-Canada, professor in the department of government 
 Tinsley Randolph Harrison, physician and editor of the first five editions of Harrison's Principles of Internal Medicine
 Basil Hirschowitz, father of the modern endoscope
 Robert Hyatt, co-author of Cray Blitz, two-time winner of the World Computer Chess Championships
 Adrienne C. Lahti, F. Cleveland Kinney Endowed Chair in the Department of Psychiatry and Behavioral Neurobiology.
 Timothy R. Levine, Distinguished Professor and Chair of Communication Studies, creator of Truth-Default Theory
 Kerry Madden, professor of creative writing
 Carl E. Misch, founded The Misch International Implant Institute
 Henry Panion, University Professor of Music, music director for Stevie Wonder, Grammy Award-winning arranger and producer
 Gregory Pence, professor of philosophy
 Ray Reach, former director of the UAB Jazz Ensemble (1998–2005), arranger, composer, jazz pianist and vocalist, Director of Student Jazz Programs at the Alabama Jazz Hall of Fame
 Michael Saag, AIDS researcher
 Jessica A. Scoffield, microbiologist
 Eric Sorscher, director of the Gregory Fleming James Cystic Fibrosis Research Center from 1994–2015

References 

Lists of people by university or college in Alabama

Birmingham, Alabama-related lists